The first season of the American animated sitcom Bob's Burgers began airing on Fox in the United States on January 9, 2011, and concluded on May 22, 2011. Thirteen episodes long, the season was produced by Bento Box Entertainment in association with 20th Century Fox Television. The series follows the family—father Bob, mother Linda, daughters Louise and Tina Belcher, and son Gene. The show features the voices of H. Jon Benjamin, Dan Mintz, Eugene Mirman, John Roberts and Kristen Schaal in their roles of the Belcher family. This is the only season that was animated using Adobe Flash.

The series premiere, "Human Flesh", was broadcast directly after The Simpsons at 8:00 p.m., and was watched by 9.41 million viewers, making it the highest-rated new series premiere of the season. The season received mixed reviews from television commentators, particularly "Torpedo", "Spaghetti Western and Meatballs" and "Art Crawl", however some critics disliked the themes of the episodes. The Volume One DVD box set, including all 13 episodes and the initial pilot developed for 2010 airing, was released in Region 1 on April 17, 2012. It has not been released in other regions. Loren Bouchard conceived the idea for Bob's Burgers after developing Home Movies for UPN.

Episodes

Music

References

2011 American television seasons
Bob's Burgers seasons